Antong, alternatively rendered as Hantum (1245 or 1248–1293), was a prominent official the Yuan dynasty of China, serving during the reign of the Yuan founder Kublai Khan. As a great-grand son of Muqali of the Jalayir clan, one of the greatest generals under Genghis Khan, he became an influential administrator in the administration of the Yuan dynasty, one of the chiefs of Kublai's administration.

He was born to Ba'atur (d. 1261), a grandson of Muqali, and Temülün, the elder sister of Kublai's wife Chabi.

Antong was well educated in Confucianism, and had accompanied Kublai since he was still a boy. He had a good knowledge of Chinese law, and was one of the Mongolian aristocrats who were most popular with the Han. After the enthronement of Kublai Khan in 1260, he was appointed the commander of the imperial guards, when he was only sixteen. In 1265, he was again appointed as the grand chancellor of the Central Secretariat (Zhongshu Sheng), and actively supported Kublai Khan to adopt and honor Confucianism and Chinese court rituals, and opposed the influence of Ahmad Fanakati.

In 1275, he was dispatched to assist Nomokhan, a son of Kublai Khan, to confront the attacks of Kaidu from Central Asia. Unfortunately, he was captured due to the insurgency of his own underlings, and was given to the Mengu-Timur, khan of the Golden Horde, who in turn passed him on to Kaidu. He was not allowed to return to the Yuan Dynasty until 1284. However, he gradually lost the trust of Kublai Khan upon return, and died in 1293. After the enthronement of Temur (Emperor Chengzong), he was granted the title of the Prince of Dongping Zhongxian in 1303.

References

1248 births
1293 deaths
Yuan dynasty right chancellors